The Blazing Trail may refer to:

 The Blazing Trail (1921 film), a 1921 American silent melodrama film, directed by Robert Thornby
 The Blazing Trail (1949 film), a 1949 American western film, directed by Ray Nazarro